The Jabra Ladies Open is a professional golf tournament, introduced on the Ladies European Tour schedule in 2018.

The tournament is played at the Evian Resort Golf Club in France and has since 2014 served as European qualifying competition for the Evian Championship, the continental Europe women's major. It was named the Jabra Ladies Open in 2016 and joined the LET Access Series schedule in 2017. It became the first dual ranking event on the LET Access Series and LET in 2018.

Winners

References

External links

Ladies European Tour
Evian Resort Golf Club

Ladies European Tour events
LET Access Series events
Golf tournaments in France